Mathilde Andraud  (born 28 April 1989, in Montpellier) is a French athlete who is a specialist in the javelin throw.

She was French junior champion in 2008, then Under-21 champion in 2011. She won five national titles in the javelin at the French Athletics Championships, in 2012, 2013, 2014, 2015 and 2016.

However, she missed qualifying for the World championships in Beijing by 40 centimetres.

At the end of the 2016 season, she quit her coach, Magali Brisseault, to train at  Montpellier with Jean-Yves Cochand and at Offenbourg with Werner Daniels, the coach of the legendary Christina Obergföll.

International competitions

National titles
 French Athletics Championships 
Javelin throw: 2012, 2013, 2014, 2015, 2016

Records

References

External links 
 

1989 births
Living people
Sportspeople from Montpellier
French female javelin throwers
Athletes (track and field) at the 2016 Summer Olympics
Olympic athletes of France
20th-century French women